Battle of Łowczówek was a battle during World War I, fought on 22–25 December 1914 at Łowczówek, between the First Brigade of the Polish Legions, fighting for Austria-Hungary, and troops of Imperial Russia. The First Brigade was supported by some units of Hungarian infantry and Austrian artillery. The Austro-Hungarian-Polish forces held back the developing Russian offensive in the region, which allowed the bulk of the Austrian army to avoid being surrounded and to withdraw, but had to yield their positions in the face of continued Russian attacks and the danger of being encircled itself.

Background 
In the first phase of the war, Russian Empire wanted to knock Austria-Hungary out of the conflict. To achieve this, the Russians invaded Galicia. By November 1914, they had captured Tarnów and Tuchów, and moved westwards, to Kraków. In December 1914, the Russians, who were divided into two armies (those of Generals Aleksei Brusilov and Radko Dimitriev), were stalled in the bloody Battle of Limanowa.

Following the battle, the Russians began to retreat to the positions along the Dunajec river, on the Carpathian Foothill. Soon afterwards, they counterattacked with 3rd Army of General Dimitriev, in the area of villages of Łowczów and Łowczówek. This area was located between two Austrian armies (3rd and 4th), and the Russians saw their chance in breaking the front of the enemy. To stop the Russians, Austrian headquarters designated the First Brigade of the Polish Legions under Józef Piłsudski. At that time, the brigade was stationed in Nowy Sącz.

Battle
Polish unit arrived at the battlefield in the evening of December 22, 1914, and immediately attacked enemy, in order not to allow the Russians to establish their positions on local hills. 1st Regiment, commanded Edward Rydz-Śmigły, was ordered to attack Hill 360, and 5th Regiment under Mieczysław Norwid-Neugebauer attacked Hill 343. 1st Regiment managed to capture the objective, but the attack of the 5th Regiment was halted due to strong Russian fire and darkness. In the morning of December 23, 5th Regiment, with support of Hungarian infantry and Austrian artillery, finally captured Hill 343.

Meanwhile, Russians reinforced their units and prepared a counterattack. In the night of December 23/24 they approached Polish positions and carried out several attacks. In the afternoon of December Józef Piłsudski was ordered to withdraw his brigade: the order was soon changed and Poles had to recapture the hills.

On December 25 the Russians attacked from Tuchów, along the road to Gromnik. Due to dense fog, both sides used bayonets, and Austrian units, defending their positions near Chojnik retreated, making it impossible to keep the line of the Biała river. Finally, at 1 p.m. on December 25, Poles were ordered to abandon their positions. Their retreat was very difficult, as Russians fiercely attacked their enemy from all sides. The First Brigade was sent to the rear, and rested in Lipnica Murowana.

Aftermath 
The Brigade captured their objectives, and managed to hold them for 4 days and 3 nights. It attacked the Russians 5 times, repelling 16 Russian counterattacks and capturing 600 prisoners of war. Due to bravery of Polish soldiers, Russian offensive was stopped, and the frontline remained static until the Gorlice–Tarnów Offensive (early May 1915).

Polish losses in the battle: 128 KIA (including 38 officers), 342 wounded. Headquarters of the 4th Army awarded 6 gold and 18 silver medals for bravery. All casualties of the battle were buried in Polish Legions Cemetery Nr. 171 in Łowczówek, near the road from Lowczow to Rychwałd.

The Battle of Łowczówek is mentioned on Tomb of the Unknown Soldier, Warsaw, with the inscription "LOWCZOWEK 24 XII 1914".

References

 Józef Kozioł: Straceńców los, czyli o legionistach spod Łowczówka. Tuchów, 1998

Łowczówek
Łowczówek
Łowczówek
Polish Legions in World War I
Łowczówek
Łowczówek
History of Lesser Poland
December 1914 events